Stan Lloyd (6 November 1911 – 27 September 1987) was an Australian rules footballer who played with St Kilda in the Victorian Football League (VFL).

A defender, Lloyd won St Kilda's best and fairest in 1938.

References

External links

1911 births
1987 deaths
Australian rules footballers from New South Wales
St Kilda Football Club players
Trevor Barker Award winners
Newtown Australian Football Club players